Laurimba Saragih (27 September 1927 – 7 June 2011) was an Indonesian politician and military person who became the Mayor of Pematangsiantar from 25 April 1967 to 28 June 1974.

Early life 
Saragih was born on 27 September 1927 in Tanggabatu, Haranggaol, Dutch East Indies.

Career 

Saragih began his military career during the Japanese Occupation of the Dutch East Indies. He supported the Indonesian government during the period of the State of East Sumatra and the Revolutionary Government of the Republic of Indonesia. In 1965, he became the Commander of the Section 1 in the Military District Commander, and participated in the Indonesian mass killings of 1965–66.

He was inaugurated as the Mayor of Pematangsiantar on 25 April 1967. He ended his term on 28 June 1974. In 1985, he was appointed as the chairman for the Golkar branch in Pematangsiantar.

He was elected by the Regional People's Representative Council of Pematangsiantar as its speaker. During this term, he introduced the slogan Sipangambei Manoktok Hitei, which was the free translation of the national motto of Indonesia, Bhinneka Tunggal Ika, in the Simalungun language.

Later life 
He died at the age of 84 on 27 June 2011 at the Horas Insani Hospital in Pematangsiantar. He was treated for respiratory problems and high fever since two days before his death.

According to his family, Saragih was a heavy smoker, and he began to stopped smoking after he returned from umrah in 2009.

Personal life 
Saragih was married to Darijah Hasvy Hutasuhut.

References 

1927 births
2011 deaths
Mayors and regents of places in North Sumatra
Mayors of places in Indonesia
People from Pematangsiantar